Weishan Yi and Hui Autonomous County is an autonomous county in the Dali Bai Autonomous Prefecture, in the west-central part of Yunnan Province, China. It was known as Menghua until the 1950s.

Geography 
It is situated in the upper section of the Ailao Mountains and the Wuliang Mountains.

Administrative divisions
Weishan Yi and Hui Autonomous County has 4 towns and 6 townships. 
4 towns

6 townships

Climate

References

External links

 Weishan introduction

County-level divisions of Dali Bai Autonomous Prefecture
Yi autonomous counties
Hui autonomous counties